The 2015–16 Northern Football League season was the 118th in the history of Northern Football League, a football competition in England.

Division One

Division One featured 19 clubs which competed in the division last season, along with three new clubs, promoted from Division Two:
 Norton & Stockton Ancients
 Seaham Red Star
 Washington

Only Bishop Auckland applied for promotion to Step 4. They would have needed to finish in the top three to achieve this.

League table

Division Two

Division Two featured 19 clubs which competed in the division last season, along with three new clubs:
 Billingham Synthonia, relegated from Division One
 Crook Town, relegated from Division One
 Easington Colliery, promoted from the Wearside Football League

League table

References

External links
 Northern Football League official site

Northern Football League seasons
9